Bayntun is an English surname. Notable people with the surname include:

Amelia Bayntun (1919–1988), English actress
Edward Bayntun (disambiguation), several people
George Bayntun (1873–1940), English bookseller, bookbinder and collector
Henry Bayntun (disambiguation), several people

See also 
 Bayntun-Rolt baronets
 Bayntun-Sandys baronets
 Baynton (disambiguation)

English-language surnames